Guangyuan railway station is a first-class railway station in Lizhou District, Guangyuan, Sichuan, China on the Baoji–Chengdu railway, Chongqing–Lanzhou railway, and Xi'an–Chengdu high-speed railway. It was built in 1954.

History
The station was closed for refurbishment from 1 July 2015 to 31 December 2015. It reopened on 1 January 2016.

References 

Railway stations in Sichuan